Sir Thomas Kavali was a politician from Jimi District of Jiwaka Province, Papua New Guinea. He held various ministries portfolio and served under Sir Michael Somare.

References

Political office-holders in Papua New Guinea